The 2021–22 Winnipeg Jets season was the 23rd season for the National Hockey League franchise that was established on June 25, 1997, and the 11th in Winnipeg, since the franchise relocated from Atlanta prior to the start of the 2011–12 NHL season.

After spending the 2020–21 season in the all-Canadian North Division, the Jets returned to the Central Division for the 2021–22 season. The Jets were eliminated from playoff contention on April 20, 2022, after the Vegas Golden Knights defeated the Washington Capitals 4–3 in overtime.

Standings

Divisional standings

Conference standings

Schedule and results

Preseason

|- style="background:#ffc;"
| 1 || September 26 || Ottawa Senators || 2–3 || OT || Comrie  || Canada Life Centre || || 0–0–1 || 
|- style="background:#cfc;"
| 2 || September 29 || Edmonton Oilers || 5–1 || || Hellebuyck || Canada Life Centre || || 1–0–1 || 
|- style="background:#fcc;"
| 3 || October 2 || @ Edmonton Oilers || 3–4 || || Comrie || Rogers Place || 15,206 || 1–1–1 || 
|- style="background:#fcc;"
| 4 || October 3 || @ Vancouver Canucks || 2–3 || || Berdin || Rogers Arena || 9,108 || 1–2–1 || 
|- style="background:#cfc;"
| 5 || October 6 || Calgary Flames || 3–4 || || Hellebuyck || Canada Life Centre ||  || 2–2–1 || 
|- style="background:#fcc;"
| 6 || October 8 || @ Calgary Flames || 3–4 || || Hellebuyck || Scotiabank Saddledome || 14,065 || 2–3–1 || 
|-

Regular season

|- style="background:#fcc;"
| 1 || October 13 || @ Anaheim Ducks || 1–4 || || Hellebuyck || Honda Center || 16,260 || 0–0–1 || 0 || 
|- style="background:#fcc;"
| 2 || October 16 || @ San Jose Sharks || 3–4 || || Hellebuyck || SAP Center || 16,137 || 0–1–1 || 0 || 
|- style="background:#ffc;"
| 3 || October 19 || @ Minnesota Wild || 5–6 || OT || Hellebuyck || Xcel Energy Center || 18,156 || 0–2–1 || 1 || 
|- style="background:#cfc;"
| 4 || October 21 || Anaheim Ducks || 5–1 || || Hellebuyck || Canada Life Centre || 13,886 || 1–2–1 || 3 || 
|- style="background:#cfc;"
| 5 || October 23 || Nashville Predators || 6–4 || || Hellebuyck || Canada Life Centre || 14,020 || 2–2–1 || 5 || 
|- style="background:#cfc;"
| 6 || October 26 || @ Anaheim Ducks || 4–3 || || Hellebuyck || Honda Center || 11,951 || 3–2–1 || 7 || 
|- style="background:#cfc;"
| 7 || October 28 || @ Los Angeles Kings || 3–2 || || Comrie || Staples Center || 11,207 || 4–2–1 || 9 || 
|- style="background:#ffc;"
| 8 || October 30 || @ San Jose Sharks || 1–2 || OT || Hellebuyck || SAP Center || 11,845 || 4–2–2 || 10 || 

|- style="background:#cfc;"
| 9 || November 2 || Dallas Stars || 4–3 || SO || Comrie || Canada Life Centre || 13,174 || 5–2–2 || 12 || 
|- style="background:#cfc;"
| 10 || November 5 || Chicago Blackhawks || 5–1 || || Comrie || Canada Life Centre || 13,756 || 6–2–2 || 14 || 
|- style="background:#fcc;"
| 11 || November 6 || New York Islanders || 0–2 || || Comrie || Canada Life Centre || 13,424 || 6–3–2 || 14 || 
|- style="background:#ffc;"
| 12 || November 9 || St. Louis Blues || 2–3 || SO || Hellebuyck || Canada Life Centre || 14,004 || 6–3–3 || 15 || 
|- style="background:#cfc;"
| 13 || November 11 || San Jose Sharks || 4–1 || || Hellebuyck || Canada Life Centre || 14,229 || 7–3–3 || 17 || 
|- style="background:#cfc;"
| 14 || November 13 || Los Angeles Kings || 3–2 || OT || Hellebuyck || Canada Life Centre || 13,776 || 8–3–3 || 19 || 
|- style="background:#cfc;"
| 15 || November 16 || Edmonton Oilers || 5–2 || || Hellebuyck || Canada Life Centre || 13,473 || 9–3–3 || 21 || 
|- style="background:#ffc;"
| 16 || November 18 || @ Edmonton Oilers || 1–2 || SO || Hellebuyck || Rogers Place || 15,273 || 9–3–4 || 22 || 
|- style="background:#fcc;"
| 17 || November 19 || @ Vancouver Canucks || 2–3 || || Comrie || Rogers Arena || 18,628 || 9–4–4 || 22 || 
|- style="background:#fcc;"
| 18 || November 22 || Pittsburgh Penguins || 1–3 || || Hellebuyck || Canada Life Centre || 13,570 || 9–5–4 || 22 || 
|- style="background:#fcc;"
| 19 || November 24 || @ Columbus Blue Jackets || 0–3 || || Hellebuyck || Nationwide Arena || 15,733 || 9–6–4 || 22 || 
|- style="background:#fcc;"
| 20 || November 26 || @ Minnesota Wild || 1–7 || || Hellebuyck || Xcel Energy Center || 19,113 || 9–7–4 || 22 || 
|- style="background:#cfc;"
| 21 || November 27 || @ Calgary Flames || 4–2 || || Hellebuyck || Scotiabank Saddledome || 17,036 || 10–7–4 || 24 || 
|- style="background:#fcc;"
| 22 || November 29 || Arizona Coyotes || 0–1 || || Hellebuyck || Canada Life Centre || 14,129 || 10–8–4 || 24 || 
|-

|- style="background:#cfc;"
| 23 || December 3 || New Jersey Devils || 8–4 || || Hellebuyck || Canada Life Centre || 13,844 || 11–8–4 || 26 || 
|- style="background:#cfc;"
| 24 || December 5 || Toronto Maple Leafs || 6–3 || || Hellebuyck || Canada Life Centre || 14,461 || 12–8–4 || 28 || 
|- style="background:#fcc;"
| 25 || December 7 || Carolina Hurricanes || 2–4 || || Hellebuyck || Canada Life Centre || 13,761 || 12–9–4 || 28 || 
|- style="background:#cfc;"
| 26 || December 9 || @ Seattle Kraken || 3–0 || || Hellebuyck || Climate Pledge Arena || 17,151 || 13–9–4 || 30 || 
|- style="background:#ffc;"
| 27 || December 10 || @ Vancouver Canucks || 3–4 || SO || Comrie || Rogers Arena || 18,457 || 13–9–5 || 31 || 
|- style="background:#fcc;"
| 28 || December 14 || Buffalo Sabres || 2–4 || || Hellebuyck || Canada Life Centre || 13,484 || 13–10–5 || 31 || 
|- style="background:#fcc;"
| 29 || December 17 || Washington Capitals || 2–5 || || Hellebuyck || Canada Life Centre || 14,039 || 13–11–5 || 31 || 
|- style="background:#cfc;"
| 30 || December 19 || St. Louis Blues || 4–2 || || Hellebuyck || Canada Life Centre || 13,524 || 14–11–5 || 33 || 
|- style="background:#ccc;"
| — || December 21 || @ Nashville Predators || colspan="8"|Postponed due to COVID-19. Moved to February 12.
|- style="background:#ccc;"
| — || December 22 || @ Dallas Stars || colspan="8"|Postponed due to COVID-19. Moved to February 11.
|- style="background:#ccc;"
| — || December 27 || Minnesota Wild || colspan="8"|Postponed due to COVID-19. Moved to February 8.
|- style="background:#ccc;"
| — || December 29 || Chicago Blackhawks || colspan="8"|Postponed due to COVID-19. Moved to February 14.
|- style="background:#ccc;"
| — || December 31 || @ Calgary Flames || colspan="8"|Postponed due to COVID-19 attendance restrictions. Moved to February 21.
|-

|- style="background:#cfc;"
| 31 || January 2 || @ Vegas Golden Knights || 5–4 || OT || Hellebuyck || T-Mobile Arena || 17,888 || 15–11–5 || 35 || 
|- style="background:#cfc;"
| 32 || January 4 || @ Arizona Coyotes || 3–1 || || Hellebuyck || Gila River Arena || 8,173 || 16–11–5 || 37 || 
|- style="background:#fcc;"
| 33 || January 6 || @ Colorado Avalanche || 1–7 || || Hellebuyck || Ball Arena || 15,171 || 16–12–5 || 37 || 
|- style="background:#ccc;"
| — || January 8 || Seattle Kraken || colspan="8"|Postponed due to COVID-19 attendance restrictions. Moved to February 17.
|- style="background:#ccc;"
| — || January 10 || Minnesota Wild || colspan="8"|Postponed due to COVID-19 attendance restrictions. Moved to February 16.
|- style="background:#cfc;"
| 34 || January 13 || @ Detroit Red Wings || 3–0 || || Hellebuyck || Little Caesars Arena || 16,829 || 17–12–5 || 39 || 
|- style="background:#ccc;"
| — || January 15 || Ottawa Senators || colspan="8"|Postponed due to COVID-19 attendance restrictions. Moved to March 24.
|- style="background:#ccc;"
| — || January 16 || Edmonton Oilers || colspan="8"|Postponed due to COVID-19. Moved to February 19.
|- style="background:#ffc;"
| 35 || January 18 || @ Washington Capitals || 3–4 || OT || Hellebuyck || Capital One Arena || 18,573 || 17–12–6 || 40 || 
|- style="background:#fcc;"
| 36 || January 20 || @ Nashville Predators || 2–5 || || Hellebuyck || Bridgestone Arena || 17,159 || 17–13–6 || 40 || 
|- style="background:#fcc;"
| 37 || January 22 || @ Boston Bruins || 2–3 || || Hellebuyck || TD Garden || 17,850 || 17–14–6 || 40 || 
|- style="background:#ffc;"
| 38 || January 23 || @ Pittsburgh Penguins || 2–3 || SO || Hellebuyck || PPG Paints Arena || 17,962 || 17–14–7 || 41 || 
|- style="background:#fcc;"
| 39 || January 25 || Florida Panthers || 3–5 || || Hellebuyck || Canada Life Centre || 250 || 17–15–7 || 41 || 
|- style="background:#fcc;"
| 40 || January 27 || Vancouver Canucks || 1–5 || || Hellebuyck || Canada Life Centre || 250 || 17–16–7 || 41 || 
|- style="background:#cfc;"
| 41 || January 29 || @ St. Louis Blues || 4–1 || || Comrie || Enterprise Center || 18,096 || 18–16–7 || 43 || 

|- style="background:#fcc;"
| 42 || February 1 || @ Philadelphia Flyers || 1–3 || || Hellebuyck || Wells Fargo Center || 13,433 || 18–17–7 || 43 || 
|- style="background:#cfc;"
| 43 || February 8 || Minnesota Wild || 2–0 || || Hellebuyck || Canada Life Centre || 7,012 || 19–17–7 || 45 || 
|- style="background:#ffc;"
| 44 || February 11 || @ Dallas Stars || 3–4 || OT || Hellebuyck || American Airlines Center || 18,014 || 19–17–8 || 46 || 
|- style="background:#cfc;"
| 45 || February 12 || @ Nashville Predators || 5–2 ||  || Hellebuyck || Bridgestone Arena || 17,688 || 20–17–8 || 48 || 
|- style="background:#fcc;"
| 46 || February 14 || Chicago Blackhawks || 1–3 ||  || Hellebuyck || Canada Life Centre || 7,511 || 20–18–8 || 48 || 
|- style="background:#cfc;"
| 47 || February 16 || Minnesota Wild || 6–3 ||  || Hellebuyck || Canada Life Centre || 12,527 || 21–18–8 || 50 || 
|- style="background:#cfc;"
| 48 || February 17 || Seattle Kraken || 5–3 ||  || Comrie || Canada Life Centre || 13,071 || 22–18–8 || 52 || 
|- style="background:#fcc;"
| 49 || February 19 || Edmonton Oilers || 2–4 ||  || Hellebuyck || Canada Life Centre || 12,360 || 22–19–8 || 52 || 
|- style="background:#fcc;"
| 50 || February 21 || @ Calgary Flames || 1–3 ||  || Hellebuyck || Scotiabank Saddledome || 9,639 || 22–20–8 || 52 || 
|- style="background:#ffc;"
| 51 || February 23 || @ Dallas Stars || 2–3 || OT || Hellebuyck || American Airlines Center || 10,098 || 22–20–9 || 53 || 
|- style="background:#fcc;"
| 52 || February 25 || @ Colorado Avalanche || 3–6 ||  || Hellebuyck || Ball Arena || 18,037 || 22–21–9 || 53 ||  
|- style="background:#cfc;"
| 53 || February 27 || @ Arizona Coyotes || 5–3 ||  || Comrie || Gila River Arena || 10,152 || 23–21–9 || 55 ||  
|-

|- style="background:#cfc;"
| 54 || March 1 || Montreal Canadiens || 8–4 || || Hellebuyck || Canada Life Centre || 13,816 || 24–21–9 || 57 || 
|- style="background:#ffc;"
| 55 || March 4 || Dallas Stars || 3–4 || OT || Hellebuyck || Canada Life Centre || 13,466 || 24–21–10 || 58 || 
|- style="background:#fcc;"
| 56 || March 6 || New York Rangers || 1–4 || || Hellebuyck || Canada Life Centre || 12,867 || 24–22–10 || 58 || 
|- style="background:#cfc;"
| 57 || March 8 || Tampa Bay Lightning || 7–4 || || Hellebuyck || Canada Life Centre || 12,925 || 25–22–10 || 60 || 
|- style="background:#cfc;"
| 58 || March 10 || @ New Jersey Devils || 2–1 || || Comrie || Prudential Center || 12,377 || 26–22–10 || 62 || 
|- style="background:#fcc;"
| 59 || March 11 || @ New York Islanders || 2–5 || || Hellebuyck || UBS Arena || 17,255 || 26–23–10 || 62 || 
|- style="background:#cfc;"
| 60 || March 13 || @ St. Louis Blues || 4–3 || OT || Hellebuyck || Enterprise Center || 18,096 || 27–23–10 || 64 || 
|- style="background:#cfc;"
| 61 || March 15 || Vegas Golden Knights || 7–3 || || Hellebuyck || Canada Life Centre || 13,470 || 28–23–10 || 66 || 
|- style="background:#fcc;"
| 62 || March 18 || Boston Bruins || 2–4 || || Hellebuyck || Canada Life Centre || 14,191 || 28–24–10 || 66 || 
|- style="background:#cfc;"
| 63 || March 20 || @ Chicago Blackhawks || 6–4 || || Hellebuyck || United Center || 19,251 || 29–24–10 || 68 || 
|- style="background:#cfc;"
| 64 || March 22 || Vegas Golden Knights || 4–0 || || Hellebuyck || Canada Life Centre || 13,690 || 30–24–10 || 70 || 
|- style="background:#fcc;"
| 64 || March 24 || Ottawa Senators || 2–5 || || Hellebuyck || Canada Life Centre || 14,175 || 30–25–10 || 70 || 
|- style="background:#cfc;"
| 66 || March 25 || Columbus Blue Jackets || 4–3 || OT || Comrie || Canada Life Centre || 13,475 || 31–25–10 || 72 || 
|- style="background:#cfc;"
| 67 || March 27 || Arizona Coyotes || 2–1 || OT || Hellebuyck || Canada Life Centre || 13,825 || 32–25–10 || 74 || 
|- style="background:#cfc;"
| 68 || March 30 || @ Buffalo Sabres || 3–2 || SO || Hellebuyck || KeyBank Center || 8,055 || 33–25–10 || 76 || 
|- style="background:#fcc;"
| 69 || March 31 || @ Toronto Maple Leafs || 3–7 || || Comrie || Scotiabank Arena || 18,517 || 33–26–10 || 76 || 
|-

|- style="background:#fcc;"
| 70 || April 2 || Los Angeles Kings || 2–3 || || Hellebuyck || Canada Life Centre || 14,067 || 33–27–10 || 76 || 
|- style="background:#fcc;"
| 71 || April 6 || Detroit Red Wings || 1–3 ||  || Hellebuyck || Canada Life Centre || 13,484 || 33–28–10 || 76 || 
|- style="background:#ffc;"
| 72 || April 8 || Colorado Avalanche || 4–5 || OT || Hellebuyck || Canada Life Centre || 13,900 || 33–28–11 || 77 || 
|- style="background:#cfc;"
| 73 || April 10 || @ Ottawa Senators || 4–3 ||  || Hellebuyck || Canadian Tire Centre || 12,207 || 34–28–11 || 79 || 
|- style="background:#cfc;"
| 74 || April 11 || @ Montreal Canadiens || 4–2 ||  || Hellebuyck || Bell Centre || 20,728 || 35–28–11 || 81 || 
|- style="background:#ccc;"
| — || April 13 || Seattle Kraken || colspan="8"|Postponed to May 1 due to weather.
|- style="background:#fcc;"
| 75 || April 15 || @ Florida Panthers || 1–6 ||  || Hellebuyck || FLA Live Arena || 17,625 || 35–29–11 || 81 || 
|- style="background:#fcc;"
| 76 || April 16 || @ Tampa Bay Lightning || 4–7 ||  || Hellebuyck || Amalie Arena || 19,092 || 35–30–11 || 81 || 
|- style="background:#fcc;"
| 77 || April 19 || @ New York Rangers || 0–3 ||  || Comrie || Madison Square Garden || 18,006 || 35–31–11 || 81 ||  
|- style="background:#fcc;"
| 78 || April 21 || @ Carolina Hurricanes || 2–4 ||  || Comrie || PNC Arena || 17,587 || 35–32–11 || 81 ||  
|- style="background:#cfc;"
| 79 || April 24 || Colorado Avalanche || 4–1 ||  || Hellebuyck || Canada Life Centre || 14,443 || 36–32–11 || 83 || 
|- style="background:#cfc;"
| 80 || April 27 || Philadelphia Flyers || 4–0 ||  || Comrie || Canada Life Centre || 13,383 || 37–32–11 || 85 || 
|- style="background:#cfc;"
| 81 || April 29 || Calgary Flames || 3–1 ||  || Hellebuyck || Canada Life Centre || 14,202 || 38–32–11 || 87 || 

|- style="background:#cfc;"
| 82 || May 1 || Seattle Kraken || 4–3 ||  || Hellebuyck || Canada Life Centre || 14,443 || 39–32–11 || 89 || 
|-

|-
| 2021–22 schedule

Player statistics

Skaters

Goaltenders

†Denotes player spent time with another team before joining the Jets. Stats reflect time with the Jets only.
‡Denotes player was traded mid-season. Stats reflect time with the Jets only.

Transactions
The Jets have been involved in the following transactions during the 2020–21 season.

Trades

Notes:
 Pittsburgh receives the pick if they reach the 2022 Stanley Cup Finals and Beaulieu plays in at least 50% of the playoff games.
 Winnipeg will instead receive a 1st-round pick in 2022 if New York wins 2 playoff rounds and Copp plays in 50% of the playoff games.
 Winnipeg can choose to receive St. Louis' 2nd-round pick in 2022 or New York's 2nd-round pick in 2023.

Players acquired

Players lost

Signings

Draft picks

Below are the Winnipeg Jets' selections at the 2021 NHL Entry Draft, which were held on July 23 to 24, 2021. It was held virtually via Video conference call from the NHL Network studio in Secaucus, New Jersey.

References

Winnipeg Jets seasons
Winnipeg Jets